William Merrill Eastcott (22 September 1883 – 22 August 1972) was a Canadian sport shooter, who competed at the 1908 Summer Olympics, winning a bronze medal in the team military rifle event.

References

External links
profile

1883 births
1972 deaths
Canadian male sport shooters
Olympic shooters of Canada
Shooters at the 1908 Summer Olympics
Olympic bronze medalists for Canada
Olympic medalists in shooting
Sportspeople from Toronto
Medalists at the 1908 Summer Olympics
20th-century Canadian people